Anaclet Wamba (born January 6, 1960) is a Congolese-French former professional boxer who competed from 1982 to 1994. He held the WBC Cruiserweight title from 1991 until 1994.

Amateur career 
Wamba had a notable amateur career. He represented the People's Republic of the Congo in the 1980 Moscow Olympic Games, as a Light Heavyweight where he lost to Benny Pike (Australia) in the round of 16.

Professional career 
Wamba turned pro in 1982 and in 1990 landed a shot at WBC Cruiserweight Title holder Massimiliano Duran, but lost via disqualification in the 12th round. Wamba had been penalized a total of five points before he was disqualified. He was given a rematch with Duran the following year, and won the belt via TKO. He defended his belt seven times before being stripped, and he subsequently retired.

Wamba became EBU (European Boxing Union) cruiserweight Champion  in 1989 in a win over Angelo Rottoli in Perugia, Umbria, Italy. He then went on to win the WBC (World Boxing Council) cruiserweight championship in a win over Massimiliano Duran in Palermo, Sicily, Italy, in 1991 and was stripped from the title in April 1996 for being overweight before his fight against Marcelo Domínguez.

Professional boxing record

See also 
 List of WBC world champions

References

External links 
 

1960 births
People from Likouala Department
Cruiserweight boxers
Republic of the Congo male boxers
Boxers at the 1980 Summer Olympics
Olympic boxers of the Republic of the Congo
Living people
World Boxing Council champions
World cruiserweight boxing champions
Republic of the Congo emigrants to France
European Boxing Union champions
French male boxers